Helen Wong (1925-2012) was a Hong Kong international lawn and indoor bowler.

Bowls career
Wong won a gold medal in the 1977 World Outdoor Bowls Championship pairs in Worthing with Elvie Chok. Four years later she won a bronze medal in the singles and a silver medal in the team event (Taylor Trophy) at the 1981 World Outdoor Bowls Championship in Toronto. In 1985 she won a third world medal when winning a silver medal in the triples at the 1985 World Outdoor Bowls Championship in Melbourne with Sandra Zakoske and Rae O'Donnell.

She won the singles bronze medal at the inaugural 1985 Asia Pacific Bowls Championships.

Wong played bowls at the Craigengower CC Bowls Club and won the National singles title seven times in 1958, 1960, 1962, 1963, 1971, 1974 & 1978. She died in 2012.

References

Hong Kong female bowls players
1925 births
2012 deaths
Bowls World Champions